The 1934 United States Senate election in Washington was held on November 6, 1934. Incumbent Democrat Clarence Dill did not run for a third term in office. He was succeeded by Democrat Lewis Schwellenbach, who defeated Republican Reno Odlin for the open seat.

Democratic primary

Candidates 
Harry W. Deegan
Charles H. Leavy, U.S. Representative from Spokane
John C. Peterson
Lewis Schwellenbach, Seattle attorney and candidate for Governor in 1932
John C. Stevenson, radio announcer and anti-poverty activist
James W. Williams

Results

Republican primary

Candidates
Frank M. Goodwin
Ralph Horr, U.S. Representative from Seattle since 1931
Frank R. Jeffrey
D.V. Morthland, State Senator from Yakima since 1917
Reno Odlin

Results

General election

Results

See also 
 1934 United States Senate elections

References

1934
Washington
United States Senate